Sir Alfred Biliotti  (14 July 1833 – 1915) was a levantine Italian who joined the British Foreign Service and eventually rose to become one of its most distinguished consular officers in the late 19th century. He was one of the first reporters of the ethnic cleansing of Turkish Cretan civilians in 1897 by local Greek troops.

Biliotti was the eldest of seven children of Vice-Consul Charles Biliotti, who was born in Livorno and later moved to Rhodes. He became a naturalised citizen in 1872.

Biliotti was also an accomplished archaeologist who conducted important excavations at sites in the Aegean, western Anatolia, and eastern Anatolia. He was made a Knight Commander of St. Michael and St. George in October 1898. Biliotti's despatches, though written in slightly poor English, are recognized as being of major value for 21st century scholars in fields as different as diplomatic history, anthropology, and of course archaeology. 

In 1897, Biliotti reported that 851 Turkish Cretans were killed by Greek troops in Lasithi. This number included 201 male and 173 female children which most of them were raped before being killed.

He served as British vice-consul at Rhodes and was transferred to Trebizond in 1873; later he was consul at Chania (Crete) and consul-general at Salonica. His service in Crete covered the period of the revolutionary movements of 1889, 1895 and 1897, in all of which Britain was concerned as one of the Great Powers. His service at Salonica saw the beginnings of the guerilla warfare which would eventually lead to the Balkan Wars.

He excavated at Camirus (1859–1864), Ialysos (1868–1870), Satala (1874) and Cirisli Tepe (1883). Many of his finds are now displayed or stored at the British Museum.

The Biliotti family mausoleum is in the Catholic Cemetery on Rhodes, a few 100 metres from the sea and near the busy Saturday market.

References

British diplomats
British archaeologists
1833 births
1915 deaths
Companions of the Order of the Bath
Knights Commander of the Order of St Michael and St George
Italian Levantines
Emigrants from the Ottoman Empire to the United Kingdom